Ministry of Agriculture, Food and Rural Affairs may refer to:
 Ministry of Agriculture, Food and Rural Affairs (South Korea)
 Ministry of Agriculture, Food and Rural Affairs (Ontario)